Phrynobatrachus cricogaster is a species of frog in the family Phrynobatrachidae. It is found in the mountains of western Cameroon and southeastern Nigeria. Common name Nkongsamba river frog has been coined for it. The specific name cricogaster  is derived from the Greek krikos for "ring" and gaster for "belly", in reference to the prominent ring pattern on its venter.

Description
Adult males measure  and adult females  in snout–vent length. The body is moderately slim. The snout is blunt. The tympanum is distinct. The fingers are blunt, hardly dilated, and have no webbing. The toes are slightly but clearly dilated in discs and are three-quarters webbed. The dorsum is brown-black and uniform or with some large brown-red scapular spots. The hind limbs have brown red bars. The venter is cream. Throat is grey and has a cream-coloured median spot near the chest. The belly bears a small central dark circle, possibly with a white center, which is and surrounded by a complete or incomplete circle touching the chest and groin. Males have a subgular vocal sac, and the gular area may be very dark.

Habitat and conservation
Breeding takes place in still pools along mountain streams. It can be locally abundant (i.e., on Mount Manengouba), but the overall population is likely to have been decreasing. It is threatened by agricultural expansion, logging, and human settlements, particularly when these activities cause its habitat to be markedly opened up. It is found in the Cross River National Park in Nigeria.

References

cricogaster
Frogs of Africa
Amphibians of Cameroon
Amphibians of West Africa
Fauna of Nigeria
Amphibians described in 1957
Taxa named by Jean-Luc Perret
Taxonomy articles created by Polbot
Fauna of the Cameroonian Highlands forests